Westmeath was a parliamentary constituency represented in Dáil Éireann, the lower house of the Irish parliament or Oireachtas from 1992 to 2007. The constituency was served by 3 deputies (Teachtaí Dála, commonly known as TDs). The method of election was proportional representation by means of the single transferable vote (PR-STV).

History
The constituency was created in 1992 under the Electoral (Amendment) Act 1990 and was first used for the 1992 general election. It was abolished under the Electoral (Amendment) Act 2005, when it was replaced by new constituency of Longford–Westmeath.

Boundaries
The constituency spanned the entire area of County Westmeath taking in Mullingar, Athlone and Moate.

TDs

Elections

2002 general election

1997 general election

1992 general election

See also 
Dáil constituencies
Politics of the Republic of Ireland
Historic Dáil constituencies
Elections in the Republic of Ireland

References

External links 
Oireachtas Members Database

Historic constituencies in County Westmeath
Dáil constituencies in the Republic of Ireland (historic)
1992 establishments in Ireland
2007 disestablishments in Ireland
Constituencies established in 1992
Constituencies disestablished in 2007